The 21st Asian Athletics Championships was held at the Wuhan Sports Center in Wuhan, China from 3–7 June 2015.

Results

Men

Women

Medal count
Key

Participating nations

See also

2015 in athletics (track and field)

References

External links
Asian Athletics Association
21st Asian Athletics Championships

 
Asian Athletics Championships
Asian Championships
Athletics
2015 in Asian sport
Sport in Wuhan
International athletics competitions hosted by China